Graecoanatolica pamphylica is a species of freshwater snail, an aquatic gastropod mollusk in the family Hydrobiidae. The species is endemic to Turkey.

References

Hydrobiidae
Graecoanatolica
Gastropods described in 1964
Endemic fauna of Turkey